Charles Karp (April 13, 1953 – March 10, 2019) was an American musician and Emmy Award-winning documentarian. A former student at Coleytown Middle School and Staples High School, both in Westport, Connecticut, he left school as a senior to pursue music. Karp had a professional career that stretched nearly 50 years. He won an Emmy producing music for films and television, and his biography credits him as working on jingles for such products as Twix candy bars, US Tobacco and Xerox. He died at age 65.

References

External links
  as Charles Karp
  as Charlie Karp
 

1953 births
2019 deaths
American male musicians
Musicians from Connecticut
Emmy Award winners
People from Fairfield, Connecticut
Staples High School alumni